Jim Gilligan is a retired head baseball coach, primarily for the Lamar Cardinals baseball program.

In his 38 seasons as head coach, Gilligan has guided Lamar's baseball team to 11 conference championships, 13 NCAA regional appearances, and five conference titles. He has been named the Southland Conference coach of the year six times during his career and is the 32nd coach in NCAA history to record 1,000 career wins. Gilligan is an alumnus of Lamar University, having earned a bachelor's degree in 1969 and a master's in 1970.

In between his years at Lamar, Gilligan coached for professional baseball teams.  The Gilligan managed 1987 Salt Lake City Trappers broke a 68-year-old record for consecutive wins.  The team ended with 29 consecutive wins.  The achievement is recognized in the Baseball Hall of Fame in Cooperstown, NY.  Gilligan's Number 29 jersey is part of a display at the hall of fame.

Recognition and awards
In 2007, Lamar baseball fans and Cardinal Club members started the fund for the Gilligan Scholarship in honor of the coach.  Donors said they hope the scholarship continues to grow and leave a permanent legacy in honor of Gilligan.  The scholarship will assist members of Lamar's baseball team in attending Lamar.

On June 29, 2010, the Beaumont City Council voted unanimously to rename a section of East Florida Avenue to Jim Gilligan Way. They cited his excellence on and off the field for bestowing this honor.

Coach Gilligan ranks fifth among the NCAA's active coaches in career victories with 1,307, with 1,297 of those being at Lamar.  His first 10 came in one season at Western New Mexico.  Gilligan achieved his 1,300th career win against the New Mexico State Aggies on February 13, 2015.

In 2004, Gilligan was inducted into the Texas Baseball Hall of Fame.

Gilligan has been named Southland Conference Coach of the Year five times and Sun Belt Conference Coach of the Year once.

Head coaching records
The following is a table of Gilligan's yearly records as an NCAA head baseball coach.

See also
List of current NCAA Division I baseball coaches
List of college baseball coaches with 1,100 wins

References

1946 births
Living people
Baseball coaches from Texas
Baseball players from Texas
People from Bayside, Queens
Lamar Cardinals baseball coaches
Lamar Cardinals baseball players
Western New Mexico Mustangs baseball coaches
Minor league baseball coaches